Bircham is a hamlet in southern Alberta, Canada within Kneehill County.

The hamlet most likely takes its name from Bircham in England.

Demographics 

See also 
List of communities in Alberta
List of designated places in Alberta
List of hamlets in Alberta

References 

Kneehill County
Hamlets in Alberta
Designated places in Alberta